Æthelred was a medieval Bishop of Cornwall.

Æthelred was bishop about 1001 and died sometime after that.

Citations

References
 Powicke, F. Maurice and E. B. Fryde Handbook of British Chronology 2nd. ed. London:Royal Historical Society 1961

Bishops of Cornwall
11th-century English Roman Catholic bishops
10th-century births
11th-century deaths
Year of birth unknown
Year of death unknown